This is a list of Assembly Members (AMs; Welsh: Aelodau'r Cynulliad, ACau) elected to the second National Assembly for Wales at the 2003 election. There are a total of 60 members elected, 40 were elected from first past the post constituencies with a further 20 members being returned from five regions, each electing four AMs through mixed member proportional representation.

AMs by party 
This is a list of AMs elected in 2003.

Members by constituency and region

Constituency members

Regional members

See also 
Government of the 2nd National Assembly for Wales
2003 National Assembly for Wales election

References 

Lists of members of the Senedd